Masindray is a rural commune in Analamanga Region, in the  Central Highlands of Madagascar. It belongs to the district of Antananarivo Avaradrano and its populations numbers to 13,505 in 2018.
It is situated at 20 km West from Antananarivo.

Roads
The town is crossed by the paved road RIP5.

Economy
The economy is based on agriculture.  Rice, corn, peanuts, beans, manioc, soja and oignons are the main crops.

References

External links

Populated places in Analamanga